Daniel Moore or Dan Moore may refer to:

Military
 Daniel B. Moore (1838–1914), American Civil War soldier and Medal of Honor recipient
 Dan Tyler Moore (1877–1941), U.S. Army officer and aide to President Theodore Roosevelt

Music
 Daniel Moore (musician) (born 1941), American singer/songwriter
 Daniel Martin Moore, American singer and songwriter

Politics
 Daniel Moore (Great Marlow MP), British Member of Parliament for Great Marlow
 Daniel Moore (Ilchester MP), British Member of Parliament for Ilchester
 Daniel A. Moore Jr. (1933–1922), justice of the Supreme Court of Alaska
 Daniel Charles Moore (1801–1890), merchant and politician in Nova Scotia, Canada
 Dan K. Moore (1906–1986), North Carolina governor
 Danny Roy Moore (1925–c. 2020), member of the Louisiana State Senate

Sports
 Danny Moore (born 1971), Australian rugby player
 Daniel Moore (footballer) (born 1988), Scottish footballer
 Dan Moore (American football), American football player

Other
 Daniel Moore (poet) (1940–2016), American poet, essayist, and librettist
 Dan Tyler Moore (author), American author
 Daniel McFarlan Moore (1869–1936), US inventor
 Danny Moore (The Inbetweeners), a character in the British sitcom The Inbetweeners
 Danny B. Moore, American academic at Chowan University